The following is a list of characters from the wuxia novel Demi-Gods and Semi-Devils by Jin Yong. There are over 230 characters in the novel, including those who are only mentioned by name. Some characters such as Duan Yu, Duan Zhengchun, Duan Zhengming, Gao Shengtai, Yelü Hongji and Wanyan Aguda are fictionalised personas of historical figures, while the rest are fictional characters.

Main characters
 Qiao Feng, birth name Xiao Feng. See Demi-Gods and Semi-Devils#Qiao Feng's story.
 Duan Yu. See Demi-Gods and Semi-Devils#Duan Yu's story.
 Xuzhu. See Demi-Gods and Semi-Devils#Xuzhu's story.
 Wang Yuyan is Duan Zhengchun and Li Qingluo's daughter who is described as a beautiful, intelligent and flawless young maiden independent of all worldly traits. As she has a crush on her cousin, Murong Fu, she memorises martial arts manuals in the hope of providing him guidance on perfecting his skills and hence win his affection. However, he neither appreciates her help nor reciprocates her feelings towards him. Although she does not practise martial arts herself, she is able to identify many forms of martial arts simply by observation. Duan Yu falls in love with her at first sight due to her resemblance to "Fairy Sister", a statue of her maternal grandaunt he once chanced upon, and starts following her wherever she goes. Although she is initially impassive towards Duan Yu, she warms up to him after he saves her on a few occasions. Towards the end of the novel, Murong Fu tells her that he wants to fight for the hand-in-marriage of the Western Xia princess so that he can form an alliance with Western Xia to help him restore the Yan kingdom. She feels so dejected upon hearing that and attempts suicide but survives. Duan Yu confronts Murong Fu and tells him he will also fight for the princess's hand-in-marriage, so as to force Murong Fu to choose Wang Yuyan. Murong Fu turns furious and knocks Duan Yu into a well. By then, Wang Yuyan realises that Murong Fu has no feelings for her so she throws herself into the well in despair to join Duan Yu. Both of them survive the fall, pledge their love to each other, and eventually leave safely. Wang Yuyan discovers later that she is Duan Zhengchun's daughter – effectively making her Duan Yu's half-sister – and feels heartbroken because she cannot be with Duan Yu anymore. Duan Yu later tells her that they can still be together because they are ultimately distant cousins since his biological father turns out to be Duan Yanqing instead of Duan Zhengchun.
 Azhu is Duan Zhengchun and Ruan Xingzhu's elder daughter who is highly skilled in the art of disguise. First appearing as a servant of the Murong family, she and Abi help Duan Yu escape from Jiumozhi. She once disguised Duan Yu and herself as Murong Fu and Qiao Feng respectively as part of a plan to save the Beggars' Gang members who had been captured by Western Xia soldiers. She later disguises herself as a monk and infiltrates Shaolin Monastery to steal the Yijin Jing for Murong Fu. Qiao Feng witnesses the act and forces her to hide with him behind a giant statue, but they are discovered by the monks. In the ensuing fight, she is injured by Xuanci, but Qiao Feng saves her and they escape. When inspecting her wounds, he finds out that she is a woman and uses his inner energy to preserve her life and cares for her while she is wounded. During this time, Azhu develops romantic feelings for Qiao Feng. Qiao Feng brings her to Xue Muhua and manages to convince the physician to heal her. After recovering, Azhu waits for Qiao Feng for five days and five nights at Yanmen Pass and tells him she wishes to accompany him forever. Qiao Feng, thereafter renamed to Xiao Feng, is touched by her dedication and reciprocates her feelings for him. Although they enjoy a happy and peaceful time together, Xiao Feng insists on finding out the identity of "Leading Big Brother" so Azhu offers to help him trick Kang Min into revealing who "Leading Big Brother" is by disguising herself as Bai Shijing. However, Kang Min, who had a secret affair with Bai Shijing, quickly sees through Azhu's disguise and lies to her that "Leading Big Brother" is Duan Zhengchun. Xiao Feng challenges Duan Zhengchun to a duel. Before the duel, Azhu finds out that Duan Zhengchun is her father and Azi is her sister. She disguises herself as Duan Zhengchun to prevent a conflict between her lover and her father, and allows Xiao Feng to kill her. It is too late when Xiao Feng realises his mistake. Before dying, Azhu reveals the truth to Xiao Feng and makes him promise to take good care of Azi. She then dies in Xiao Feng's arms and is buried in the backyard of Ruan Xingzhu's home.
 Azi is Azhu's younger sister and one of Ding Chunqiu's apprentices. Like many in the Xingxiu School, she is sadistic and cruel, taking pleasure in torturing anyone who offends her. As she had stolen the Divine Wood Royal Cauldron, a prized treasure of the Xingxiu School, and fled with it, she is considered a traitor of the school. In the latest edition of the novel, her reason for doing so was because Ding Chunqiu noticed her growing beauty and started making sexual advances on her even though she was around 16 years old and he was at least 60. You Tanzhi, who is also attracted by her beauty, willingly succumbs to her sadistic "games" to amuse her. At one point, after Ding Chunqiu blinds Azi, You Tanzhi saves her and later even offers his eyes for an eye transplant operation to help her regain her sense of sight. Yet, she does not care about him and despises him even more. She has a crush on Xiao Feng, even after he makes it clear to her that he will love no other woman except Azhu. She often taunts Xiao Feng with her sister's dying words whenever he refuses to do anything for her. When Xiao Feng refuses to help the Liao Empire attack the Song Empire, the Liao emperor sends his concubine to trick Azi into spiking Xiao Feng's wine with a "love potion". While escaping from Liao territory with Azi, Xiao Feng is suddenly seized with pain because the "love potion" is a poison that will temporarily weaken him. While Xiao Feng is captured and imprisoned by Liao forces, Azi manages to escape and seek help from Duan Yu, Xuzhu and others to save him. Although Xiao Feng is rescued, he takes the Liao emperor hostage and commits suicide after forcing the emperor to make an oath. Azi realises with despair that she cannot live without Xiao Feng and follows suit after he takes his own life.
 Mu Wanqing is Duan Zhengchun and Qin Hongmian's daughter. Her mother single-handedly raised her and forced her to make a vow: if any man sees her face, she must either marry or kill him. As such, she normally wears a mask or veil. She is pursued by Yue Laosan, who is angry that she killed his apprentice Sun Sanba, and meets Duan Yu by chance. Despite her harsh treatment towards him, he tries to help her and she falls in love with him. When Yue Laosan catches up with them, she reveals her face to Duan Yu and forces him to either marry her or die with her. He chooses the former option. She leaves him in anguish after they are revealed to be actually half-siblings. She encounters Duan Yanqing, who tricks her and Duan Yu into consuming aphrodisiac because he wants them to commit incest and disgrace the Duan family. However, Duan Zhengchun's men dig a tunnel leading to the room where she is held captive, rescue her, and replace her with Zhong Ling. She appears again in a later chapter and disguises herself as Duan Yu to temporarily take his place during the contest for the Western Xia princess's hand-in-marriage.
 Zhong Ling is Duan Zhengchun and Gan Baobao's daughter. She first meets Duan Yu while he is attempting to dissuade the Limitless Sword School and Shennong Gang from fighting. Later, she is captured and held hostage by the Shennong Gang after her pet, the Lightning Mink, bites many of them. She is ultimately rescued by Duan Yu and Mu Wanqing in disguise as messengers from Lingjiu Palace. Although she is also in love with Duan Yu, she gives up after learning that he is her half-brother. She appears again in a later chapter to take care of Duan Yu after he is wounded by Jiumozhi.

Dali Kingdom
The Duan family of Dali is the royal family of the Dali Kingdom and a reputable martial arts clan in their own right. They are known for using the "Yiyang Finger", which allows them to project streams of energy from their fingers. Some of its members are fictionalised personas of historical figures.

 Duan Zhengming is the benevolent and highly respected king of Dali. When Jiumozhi shows up at Heavenly Dragon Monastery to force the monks to give him the "Six Meridians Divine Sword" manual, Duan Zhengming abdicates and becomes a monk at the monastery to help them deal with Jiumozhi. He is thereafter known as Benchen.
 Duan Zhengchun is Duan Zhengming's younger brother. Notorious for his philandering ways, he conceives several illegitimate daughters with different women in his younger days. Ironically, three of his daughters become romantically involved with Duan Yu, whom he raises as his son. Duan Yu was actually conceived out of a past illicit affair between his wife, Dao Baifeng, and Duan Yanqing, his distant cousin and future nemesis. He succeeds his brother as the king of Dali after the latter abdicates and becomes a monk. While travelling around, he is confronted on different occasions by Duan Yanqing, who attempts to force him to hand over his throne. He commits suicide to join his lovers after they are killed by Murong Fu.
 Gao Shengtai is a marquis of Dali. He rules Dali as a regent after Duan Zhengchun's death before passing the reins of power to Duan Yu.
 Fan Hua, Ba Tianshi and Hua Hegen are the Three Ducal Ministers in the Dali government who are also highly skilled in martial arts.
 The Four Bodyguards are four highly skilled martial artists who are sworn to protect Duan Zhengchun and his family. They usually disguise themselves and accompany Duan Zhengchun when he travels around. Duan Zhengchun regards them as his friends rather than subordinates.
 Chu Wanli disguises himself as a fisherman. He is killed by Duan Yanqing.
 Gu Ducheng disguises himself as a woodcutter.
 Fu Sigui disguises himself as a farmer.
 Zhu Danchen disguises himself as a scholar. Duan Yu regards him as a close friend because both of them have common interests in literature and poetry.

Murong family
The Murong family of Gusu descended from the royal families of the Yan kingdoms (Southern Yan, Former Yan, Later Yan, etc.) of the Sixteen Kingdoms era. They are known for their fighting style best described as "returning you with your own way" because they like to use their opponents' own signature moves against them. Having attempted to master every known form of martial art in the jianghu, they have amassed a wide collection of martial arts manuals over the years.

 Murong Fu, nicknamed "Southern Murong", is the current head of the Murong family. His father named him "Fu" (literally "restore") to remind him to restore the Yan kingdom. An egoistic, scheming and ruthless man, he attempts all sorts of methods, including unscrupulous means, to revive his family's legacy. He is even willing to sever ties with his cousin Wang Yuyan, who has a crush on him, in order to realise his dream of becoming an emperor. He fails in his grand plan and becomes insane eventually. Although he has mastered numerous forms of martial arts like his father before him, he specialises in none and does not quite grasp the nuances in some of them.
 Murong Bo, alias Yan Longyuan, is Murong Fu's father. Like his son, he has the same dream of restoring the Yan kingdom. 30 years ago, he lied to Xuanci and other prominent wulin figures that the Khitans were planning to send a spy to infiltrate Shaolin Monastery and steal martial arts manuals from its library. They believed him and ambushed Xiao Yuanshan and his family at Yanmen Pass, resulting in the death of Xiao Yuanshan's wife. After this tragedy, Murong Bo faked his death and hid in Shaolin Monastery for many years, secretly learning martial arts from the manuals in the library. Eventually, he is forced to come out of hiding during the wulin gathering at Shaolin Monastery. Eventually, he realises how delusional he has been, and feels so grateful to the Sweeper Monk for saving him that he decides to be a monk for the rest of his life.
 Murong Fu has four followers who have loyally served his family for years. Towards the end of the novel, he kills Bao Butong after the latter expressly disapproves of him becoming Duan Yanqing's godson in order to win over Duan Yanqing as an ally. The other three abandon him after witnessing how he would willingly kill his own followers to fulfil his dream.
 Deng Baichuan
 Gongye Gan is nicknamed "Number Two in Jiangnan".
 Bao Butong is nicknamed "No, No" after his favourite catchphrase. He is notorious for disagreeing with people and making blunt criticisms, usually starting the conversation with "No, no".
 Feng Bo'e is nicknamed "Gust of Wind". He is always ready to pick a fight with others even when his chances of winning are low.
 Abi is a servant of the Murong family and Kang Guangling's apprentice. She and Azhu helped Duan Yu escape from Jiumozhi. She is very loyal to Murong Fu and continues serving him even after he becomes insane.
 Bao Buliang, who is only mentioned by name in the novel, is Bao Butong's daughter.

Duan Zhengchun's lovers
 Dao Baifeng is Duan Zhengchun's wife. She left her husband after discovering his extramarital relations and decided to take revenge by cheating on him. She had a one-night stand with a filthy beggar, who was actually a critically wounded Duan Yanqing, and gave birth to Duan Yu later. She only reveals the truth to her son towards the end of the novel. In the latest edition of the novel, she points out to Duan Yu that he can marry all his cousins since the relations between him and them are so distant. She commits suicide soon after to join her dead husband.
 Qin Hongmian is nicknamed "Sura Dagger". She left Duan Zhengchun after learning of his multiple affairs with other women and single-handedly raised their daughter, Mu Wanqing, whom she also trained in martial arts. Towards the end of the novel, Murong Fu tries to use her and Duan Zhengchun's other mistresses as hostages to force Duan Zhengchun to pass the throne to Duan Yanqing. When Duan Zhengchun refuses, Murong Fu kills Qin Hongmian, Gan Baobao, Ruan Xingzhu and Li Qingluo.
 Gan Baobao is Zhong Wanchou's wife. Her daughter, Zhong Ling, was conceived from a secret affair she had with Duan Zhengchun, and has been raised as Zhong Wanchou's daughter over the years. She first appears when Duan Yu comes to Wanjie Valley to seek help in rescuing Zhong Ling, who had been captured and held hostage by the Shennong Gang.
 Ruan Xingzhu is the mother of Azhu and Azi. As she bore her daughters out of wedlock, she abandoned them to protect Duan Zhengchun's reputation. Later, by chance, she is reunited with her daughters but only manages to identify Azi; Azhu is killed by Xiao Feng by mistake before she can acknowledge her parents.
 Kang Min, also known as Mrs Ma, is Ma Dayuan's wife and one of Duan Zhengchun's mistresses. She was attracted to Qiao Feng and had attempted to vie for his attention but he did not take notice of her. Feeling scorned, she plots his downfall after discovering the sealed letter about his Khitan heritage by chance. She seduces Bai Shijing and gets him to help her murder her husband while concurrently having another affair with Quan Guanqing, whom she instigates to incite the Beggars' Gang elders to rebel against Qiao Feng. Later, she tricks Qiao Feng and Azhu into believing that "Leading Big Brother" is Duan Zhengchun, indirectly causing Azhu's tragic death. When Duan Zhengchun visits her later to find out why she directed Qiao Feng to kill him, she uses the opportunity to take revenge on him for betraying her love. She tricks him into consuming a potion that temporarily weakens him and tortures him until Bai Shijing shows up. When Bai Shijing wants to kill Duan Zhengchun to silence him, he ends up being killed by a masked Xiao Yuanshan. Kang Min ultimately finds herself at the mercy of Azi, who tortures and disfigures her in the name of avenging Azhu. She dies of shock after seeing her reflection in a mirror because she had prided herself on her beauty.

Mantuo Manor
 Li Qingluo, also known as Mrs Wang, is the owner of Mantuo Manor on an island in Lake Tai. Her parents are Wuyazi and Li Qiushui; she is also Wang Yuyan's mother and Murong Fu's maternal aunt. After learning that Duan Zhengchun has cheated her feelings by having secret affairs with other women, she develops a hatred of men and sends her servants to kill every man who crosses her path. She prides herself on her island's camellia flowers, and makes an exception to her intolerance of men by allowing Duan Yu to stay in her manor as a caretaker for her flowers. She collaborates with Murong Fu and Duan Yanqing in an attempt to scare Duan Zhengchun and take revenge on him for betraying her love. However, she soon realises how far Murong Fu is willing to go in order to force Duan Zhengchun to give up his throne when her nephew starts killing Duan's mistresses one by one. Murong Fu soon points his sword at her after Duan expresses his love for her. In an attempt to save her, Duan lies to her that he hates her and will never love her because she caused his other lovers to die. Feeling despair, she throws herself on Murong Fu's sword to end her life. Just before she dies, Duan regrets and tells her that he still loves her.
 Li Qingluo has numerous servants, some of whom are also highly skilled martial artists.
 Granny Rui and Granny Ping are sent to hunt down and kill Qin Hongmian and Mu Wanqing after they attempted to assassinate Li Qingluo.
 Yan Mama is in charge of the fertiliser room in the manor.

Four Evils
The "Four Evils" are a group of four eccentric martial artists notorious for committing heinous crimes. Their nicknames are Chinese idioms used to describe evil persons. The four are ranked in order of seniority:

 Duan Yanqing, nicknamed "Overflowing with Evil", is a distant cousin of Duan Zhengming and Duan Zhengchun, and a former crown prince of Dali. Duan Yanqing's father, the former king, was overthrown and killed in a rebellion. During the chaos, Duan Yanqing was critically wounded and became so crippled and disfigured that no one could recognise him. After the rebellion was suppressed, Duan Yanqing was presumed dead, so Duan Zhengming was crowned the new king. Feeling resentful that his right to become king had been taken from him, Duan Yanqing plots his revenge and attempts to seize the throne by threatening and harming Duan Zhengchun and Duan Yu on different occasions. Although he appears to be a crippled old man on crutches, his mastery of the "Yiyang Finger" is extremely powerful. He has the ability to channel his inner energy to his abdomen and speak without using his vocal cords. He gives up on his quest to reclaim the throne and becomes a recluse when he realises that his biological son, Duan Yu, will eventually become the king of Dali, thereby returning the royal lineage to his bloodline.
 Ye Erniang is nicknamed "No Evil Left Undone". She had a secret romance with Xuanci and bore him a son, who was taken away from her by a masked attacker. She suffers from depression and resorts to kidnapping other people's babies and treating them as her own before killing them. (In the latest edition of the novel, she leaves the babies at strangers' homes after playing with them.) At the wulin gathering at Shaolin, she recognises Xuzhu as her son after seeing the joss stick burn marks on his back and reunites with him. She dies together with Xuanci after he publicly confesses his affair with her.
 Yue Laosan, nicknamed "Malevolent Deity and Evil Devil", is also known as the "Crocodile Deity of the Southern Sea". He is the most comical character in the novel because of his repeated (but unsuccessful) attempts to make Duan Yu his apprentice, which concluded with him being outsmarted by Duan Yu and becoming Duan's apprentice (in name) instead. He often bickers with Ye Erniang and claims that he should be ranked second among the Four Evils, but concedes to her upon her death. Armed with a pair of giant scissors, he often threatens to kill people by breaking their necks. He is killed by Duan Yanqing while trying to save Duan Yu.
 Yun Zhonghe, nicknamed "Thoroughly Cruel, Utterly Evil", is a lecherous fiend who preys on young women. He is armed with an iron staff and relies on his formidable prowess in qinggong to pursue his targets and flee from danger. He is viciously killed by Duan Yu when he attempts to make sexual advances on Wang Yuyan after the deaths of Duan Zhengchun and his lovers.
 Tan Qing, nicknamed "Soul Chasing Staff", is Duan Yanqing's apprentice. He is killed by Qiao Feng while attempting to disrupt the gathering at Heroes' Gathering Manor.
 Sun Sanba, nicknamed "Little Devil", was Yue Laosan's apprentice who is only mentioned by name in the novel. He was killed by Mu Wanqing after he saw her face.

Shaolin School

The Shaolin School, based in Shaolin Monastery on Mount Song, is headed by senior monks of the Xuan generation with the abbot at the helm. The Xuan generation is preceded by the Ling generation and followed by the Hui, Xu and Kong generations.

 Xuanci is the current abbot. In his younger days, he violated the Shaolin code of conduct by having a secret romance with Ye Erniang, and she bore him a son, Xuzhu, without his knowledge. Shortly after Xuzhu was born, Xiao Yuanshan kidnapped the baby from Ye Erniang and left him in the garden of Shaolin, where the monks found the baby and decided to raise him as one of them. Xuanci is actually the mysterious "Leading Big Brother" who had led the attack on Xiao Yuanshan's family at Yanmen Pass several years ago after receiving misleading information from Murong Bo. He expressed remorse for his sins but could not find the courage to acknowledge that he was wrong. Towards the end of the novel, he publicly confesses his relationship with Ye Erniang and dies in peace after accepting punishment for his misconduct.
 The Sweeper Monk is a nameless monk in charge of maintaining the library of Shaolin. Over the years, he has seen Murong Bo and Xiao Yuanshan hiding in the library and secretly learning Shaolin skills from the manuals, but they have never noticed him. During the final confrontation between Murong Bo and Xiao Yuanshan, the Sweeper Monk appears and points out how they have suffered grievous internal injuries over the years from attempting to master Shaolin skills without using Buddhist teachings as a guiding philosophy. He overpowers them, temporarily puts them to sleep and heals them physically and mentally. When they regain consciousness, they realise how delusional they have been, and feel so grateful to be saved that they decide to become monks for the rest of their lives and practise Buddhism under the Sweeper Monk's guidance.
 Xuancheng was obsessed with trying to master all of Shaolin's 72 most powerful skills and he ended up sustaining grievous internal injuries and becoming permanently disabled. After this experience, he realised his past folly and dedicated the rest of his life to practising Buddhism. He is only mentioned by name in the novel when the Sweeper Monk used him as an example to warn Murong Bo, Xiao Yuanshan and Jiumozhi against attempting to master all the 72 skills without using Buddhist teachings as a guiding philosophy.
 Xuanbei travelled to Dali to help the Duan family when he heard that they were under attack by the "Four Evils". On the way, he was ambushed and murdered by Murong Bo in Luliangzhou.
 Xuanku trained Qiao Feng in martial arts before he joined the Beggars' Gang. He is mortally wounded by Xiao Yuanshan. When Qiao Feng comes to visit him later, he mistakes Qiao Feng for Xiao Yuanshan because of the similarities in their appearances, and wrongly accuses Qiao Feng of attacking him before succumbing to his injuries.
 Xuannan is the head of the Bodhidharma Hall, which oversees martial arts training in Shaolin. He is poisoned to death by Ding Chunqiu.
 Xuandu is defeated and injured by Jiumozhi when the latter comes to challenge Shaolin.
 Xuanji is the head of the Discipline Hall, which is in charge of maintaining order in Shaolin. He ultimately succeeds Xuanci as the abbot.
 Xuanyin, Xuansheng and Xuanzhi once joined Xuanci and Xuandu in disguising themselves to spar with Qiao Feng to find out if he was the one who killed Xuanku.
 Xuanshi secretly followed Xiao Feng to find out if he was really the one who murdered Xu Chongxiao and the others. He is killed by Liao warriors while saving Xiao Feng from captivity.
 Xuanming is killed by Liao warriors while saving Xiao Feng from captivity.
 Xuantong is injured by You Tanzhi's icy venom skill. While recovering, he suddenly attains enlightenment and dies.
 Lingmen was the former abbot who is only mentioned by name in the novel.
 Other members of the Xuan generation include: Xuancan, Xuankui, Xuannian, Xuanjing and Xuanmie.
 Huilun is Xuzhu's master.
 Huijing is a monk who catches the Ice Silkworm.
 Huizhen and Huiguan are Xuanbei's apprentices who accompanied him to Dali to assist the Duan family. After their master was murdered in Luliangzhou, they continued their journey to Dali and reported their master's death to the Duan family.
 Huifang and Huijing accompanied Xuannan to meet Su Xinghe.
 Xuqing, Xuzhan and Xuyuan are in charge of maintaining the Bodhi Hall, where the Yijin Jing is kept. Azhu disguised herself as Xuqing when she sneaked into Shaolin to steal the Yijin Jing.

Beggars' Gang

 Ma Dayuan is the deputy chief of the gang. A righteous and humble man, he was entrusted with safekeeping a sealed letter containing information about Qiao Feng's origin, but has never opened it. His wife, Kang Min, seduces Bai Shijing and instigates him to murder her husband. Bai Shijing uses Ma Dayuan's signature move to kill him and attempts to push the blame to Murong Fu.
 Wang Jiantong, nicknamed "Sword Beard", was the former chief of the gang and one of those involved in the attack on Xiao Yuanshan's family at Yanmen Pass. He had died of natural causes before the events of the novel took place. However, before his death, he had passed a sealed letter containing information about Qiao Feng's origins to Ma Dayuan for safekeeping, and had given instructions that the letter can only be opened in the presence of the gang's elders if Ma dies under suspicious circumstances.
 The Four Senior Elders are incited by Quan Guanqing to rebel against Qiao Feng and remove him from his position as chief. Their plan fails and they have to take their own lives for rebelling against the chief. However, Qiao Feng pardons them on account of their past contributions to the gang.
 Wu Changfeng
 Chen Guyan
 Xi Shanhe is regarded by Qiao Feng as both a friend and a mentor. At Heroes' Gathering Manor, they drink to sever ties with each other; Qiao Feng kills him in the ensuing battle.
 Elder Song
 Bai Shijing is the elder in charge of maintaining discipline in the gang. He is seduced by Kang Min and instigated by her to murder Ma Dayuan. Later, just as he is about to kill Duan Zhengchun (who has been poisoned by Kang Min), a masked Xiao Yuanshan suddenly shows up and uses Ma Dayuan's signature move to kills him.
 Quan Guanqing, nicknamed "All Rounded Scholar", is the leader of the Dazhi Branch. He was seduced by Kang Min and instigated by her to incite the Four Senior Elders to rebel against Qiao Feng. Later, he meets You Tanzhi by chance and helps You become the new chief of the Beggars' Gang with the intention of turning You into a puppet chief under his control. He also manipulates You Tanzhi into helping him get rid of his rivals within the Beggars' Gang, and instigates You Tanzhi to issue a challenge to the Shaolin School for the position of leader of the wulin. After You Tanzhi meets his downfall at the wulin gathering at Shaolin, Quan Guanqing attempts to escape but the Beggars' Gang elders track him down and kill him.
 Xu Chongxiao is a retired elder of the gang who appears at the meeting in Apricot Forest to affirm that the contents of the letter about Qiao Feng's origin are genuine. Later, he was murdered by Xiao Yuanshan just before Qiao Feng comes to ask him about the identity of the "Leading Big Brother".
 Lü Zhang is an elder in charge of supervising martial arts training.
 Elder Xiang is an elder in charge of supervising martial arts training.
 Branch Leader Jiang is the leader of the Dayi Branch.
 Deputy Branch Leader Xie is Branch Leader Jiang's deputy. He is killed by Western Xia mercenaries.
 Branch Leader Fang
 Zhang Quanxiang
 Li Chunlai and Liu Zhuzhuang are two low-ranking members of the gang who passed a false message to Bai Shijing during the plot to overthrow Qiao Feng. They committed suicide later.

Carefree School
 Wuyazi is the leader of the Carefree School. He was ambushed and thrown off a cliff by his apprentice, Ding Chunqiu, who betrayed him. He has incredible inner energy but is unable to take revenge because he was crippled by the fall. When Xuzhu meets him after breaking his weiqi formation by luck, he is already in his 90s and has been waiting all these years for a potential successor. Before dying, he transfers his 70 years' worth of inner energy to Xuzhu and names him the new leader of the Carefree School. He also gives Xuzhu a painting of a woman (Li Qiushui's sister) who looks like Wang Yuyan and tells Xuzhu to find her and ask her to guide him in martial arts.
 Li Qiushui is Wuyazi's junior and Tianshan Tonglao's rival. Wuyazi cohabited with her for some time in a cave at Limitless Mountain and conceived a daughter, Li Qingluo, with her. However, his true love was Li Qiushui's younger sister, so he neglects Li Qiushui. Li Qiushui eventually became a consort of the Western Xia emperor and rose to the position of imperial consort dowager after her husband's death. She is already in her late 80s when the events of the novel take place. She dies together with Tianshan Tonglao in the aftermath of their final showdown when they finally realise that Wuyazi loves neither of them.
 Su Xinghe, nicknamed "Deaf Mute Old Man" and "Intelligent Gentleman", is Wuyazi's first apprentice and a master of various arts. As he indulged in his hobbies, he gradually neglected his martial arts practice and became weaker compared to his junior, Ding Chunqiu. After Ding Chunqiu betrayed their master, Su Xinghe saved Wuyazi and pretended to be mute and deaf to put Ding Chunqiu off guard. All these years, he secretly took care of Wuyazi while helping him find a potential heir. He eventually dies after being poisoned by Ding Chunqiu.
 The "Eight Friends of Hangu" are Su Xinghe's apprentices who each specialises in a particular art or hobby as indicated by their nicknames:
 Kang Guangling, nicknamed "Qin Craze".
 Fan Bailing, nicknamed "Qi Devil".
 Gou Du, nicknamed "Bookworm".
 Wu Lingjun, nicknamed "Painting Enthusiast".
 Xue Muhua, nicknamed "Divine Physician". He hosts the wulin meeting at Heroes' Gathering Manor along with the You brothers to discuss plans to deal with Qiao Feng. Although he is initially reluctant to heal an injured Azhu, he agrees after Bai Shijing offers to teach him a skill in exchange for healing Azhu. Azhu disguises herself as him when she escapes from the manor to reunite with Qiao Feng.
 Feng Asan, nicknamed "Marvellous Craftsman".
 Shi Qingfeng, nicknamed "Flower Zealot".
 Li Kuilei, nicknamed "Opera Fan".

Lingjiu Palace
 Tianshan Tonglao, literally Child Old Woman of Mount Heaven, is the ruler of Lingjiu Palace on the Ethereal Peak of Mount Heaven. Formerly from the Carefree School, she was Wuyazi and Li Qiushui's senior, and had been fighting with Li Qiushui all these years for Wuyazi's love. She has started practising "The World and Six Harmonies Egocentric Skill" since she was six and it has increased her powers tremendously. However, the side effect is that every 30 years, she will lose her powers and revert back to being a little girl, and then take the corresponding number of days (one day for each year) to "grow" back to her current age and cumulatively regain her powers. As she was once interrupted by Li Qiushui during a training session, her body size had since been stuck at that of a little girl's, hence her name. She is already 96 when the events of the novel take place. Over the years, she has used the "Life and Death Talisman" to poison many martial artists and force them to submit to her. If they follow her orders, she periodically gives them an antidote to temporarily ease their suffering; if they do not, they will suffer painful deaths. The martial artists under her rule cannot tolerate her cruelty and eventually rebel against her. When the rebellion occurred, she had just lost her powers and would take 90 days to recover. Wu Laoda, the rebel leader, mistook her for a servant girl and kidnapped her from the palace. Xuzhu saves her and protects her from the rebels and Li Qiushui. In return, Tianshan Tonglao tricks or forces Xuzhu into learning martial arts from her despite his reluctance because he still sees himself as a Shaolin monk. In order to force Xuzhu to break the Buddhist code of conduct so that he can no longer be a monk, she captures Princess Yinchuan, tricks her and Xuzhu into consuming aphrodisiac, and lets them make love. Xuzhu is unable to restrain himself and eventually accepts his fate. Tianshan Tonglao dies from exhaustion after her final fight with Li Qiushui; both of them realise that Wuyazi never truly loved either of them.
 Plum Sword, Orchid Sword, Chrysanthemum Sword and Bamboo Sword are the Four Attendants to the ruler of Lingjiu Palace. They are named after the Four Gentlemen.
 Yu Po is the leader of the Haotian Section.
 Shi Sao is the leader of the Zhutian Section.
 Fu Minyi is the leader of the Yangtian Section.
 Cheng Qingshuang is the deputy leader of the Juntian Section.

Xingxiu School
 Ding Chunqiu, nicknamed "Old Freak of Xingxiu", is Wuyazi's former apprentice. He attempted to murder his master by ambushing him and throwing him off a cliff, but did not know that his master had actually survived. He moved to the area near Xingxiu Lake and founded the Xingxiu School, surrounding himself with "apprentices" who are mostly sycophants. When the events of the novel take place, the Xingxiu School is already notorious in the jianghu for its use of poison-based martial arts and the "Energy Absorbing Skill" which allows the user to drain another martial artist's inner energy. Ding Chunqiu is ultimately defeated by Wuyazi's successor, Xuzhu, and implanted with the "Life and Death Talisman". Although Xuzhu had promised Wuyazi to kill Ding Chunqiu to avenge him, he spares Ding Chunqiu's life and suggests to the Shaolin monks to imprison Ding Chunqiu and try to reform him. If Ding Chunqiu behaves well, Xuzhu will give him the antidote to temporarily ease the agony caused by the "Life and Death Talisman".
 Zhaixingzi is Ding Chunqiu's eldest apprentice. He is defeated by Azi, who has received secret assistance from Xiao Feng.
 Shihouzi, Moyunzi, Zhuifengzi, Chuchenzi and Tianlangzi are among Ding Chunqiu's apprentices.

Liao Empire
 Yelü Hongji is the ambitious emperor of the Liao Empire. He once led a raid on the Jurchen tribes but was defeated and captured by Xiao Feng, who spared his life and became sworn brothers with him. After Xiao Feng helps him suppress the rebellion by Yelü Nielugu and Yelü Chongyuan, in return he gives Yelü Nielugu's princely title and estate to Xiao Feng. Towards the end of the novel, he plans to attack the Song Empire and wants Xiao Feng to lead his army, but the latter refuses. In the last chapter, Xiao Feng takes him hostage and forces him to promise that there will be no war between the Liao and Song Empires for as long as he lives.
 Yelü Nielugu is Yelü Chongyuan's son and a prince of the Liao Empire. He rebels against Yelü Hongji to help his father seize the throne but is defeated and slain by Xiao Feng. Yelü Hongji then gives Nielugu's title and estate to Xiao Feng.
 Yelü Chongyuan is an uncle of Yelü Hongji and a Liao prince. He is instigated by his son, Yelü Nielugu, to rebel against Yelü Hongji but the revolt is suppressed. He commits suicide after his defeat.
 Yelü Moge is a minister in the Liao government.
 Noble Consort Mu is Yelü Hongji's favourite concubine. She tricks Azi into spiking Xiao Feng's drink with a "love potion", which is actually a drug that will cause him to be temporarily weakened.

Western Xia Empire
 Princess Yinchuan is a Western Xia princess. Her personal name is not mentioned in the earlier versions of the novel; in the latest revision, her name is Li Qinglu. The princess is Li Qiushui's granddaughter; thus, she is Li Qingluo's niece and Wang Yuyan's cousin, but they are not aware of their relations. She is abducted by Tianshan Tonglao, who makes her consume aphrodisiac and brings her to the ice cellar every night to make love with Xuzhu. This is all part of Tianshan Tonglao's attempt to force Xuzhu to break the Buddhist code of conduct and make him agree to learn martial arts from her; in the process, Xuzhu and the princess fall in love. Princess Yinchuan has never seen Xuzhu's appearance because they had sex in the dark and they only know each other as "dream lovers". In a later chapter, she asks her father to invite martial artists from throughout the jianghu to participate in a contest to win her hand-in-marriage in the hope that her "dream lover" will show up. Her wish is fulfilled when Xuzhu joins the contest and provides the correct answers to her questions. She recognises him as her "dream lover" and happily marries him.
 Helian Tieshu is a Western Xia general. He is in charge of First Class Hall, an organisation established by the Western Xia government to recruit martial artists from all over the jianghu to serve as mercenaries.

Tibet
 Jiumozhi, nicknamed "Mahā-cakra-vajra" after a Buddhist wisdom king, is a reputable Tibetan monk from a Nyingma monastery in the Daxue Mountains. He is well-versed in Buddhism and martial arts; his most powerful skill is "Flaming Saber", which allows him to project a flaming, blade-like wave of energy from his bare hands. Although he appears to be kind and approachable, he is ruthless in his ways and extremely obsessed with becoming the most powerful martial artist in the jianghu. After failing in his attempt to seize the "Six Meridians Divine Sword" manual from Heavenly Dragon Monastery, he kidnaps Duan Yu upon learning that the latter has memorised the book. He tries to con and intimidate Duan Yu to write the manual from memory, but Duan Yu escapes with the help of Azhu and Abi. At one point, he challenges the Shaolin School, claiming to have mastered all of Shaolin's 72 most powerful skills. He fights with Xuzhu, who recognises that he is actually using non-Shaolin skills in a way that makes them look like Shaolin skills. Xuzhu manages to counter Jiumozhi's every move and the challenge comes to an inconclusive end when Xuzhu's bodyguards show up to protect their master after Jiumozhi tries to stab him with a dagger. Towards the end of the novel, he sustains grievous internal injuries due to his attempts to master Shaolin skills by taking "shortcuts" and not using Buddhist teachings as a guiding philosophy, and nearly dies due to an imbalance of inner energy. However, Duan Yu saves his life by draining away all his inner energy. Despite losing everything he had built up through years of practice, he feels grateful to Duan Yu and repents after seeing how his obsession had caused him to stray so far from Buddhist teachings.
 Zongzan is a Tibetan prince who goes to Western Xia to participate in the contest for Princess Yinchuan's hand-in-marriage.

Jurchens
 Wanyan Aguda is a Jurchen warrior who encounters Xiao Feng by chance and witnesses him slaying a ferocious bear with his bare hands. He is so impressed with Xiao Feng's skill that he invites him to live together with his tribe.
 Helibu is Wanyan Aguda's father and the chief of a Jurchen tribe.
 Sidalin is the deputy chief of the Jurchen tribe.
 Xu Zhuocheng is a Han Chinese trader who is fluent in the Jurchen language. He serves as Xiao Feng's translator when he is living with the Jurchens.

Heroes' Gathering Manor
 You Tanzhi is the heir to the Heroes' Gathering Manor run by the You brothers. After the brothers lose to Qiao Feng, they commit suicide in shame and leave behind You Tanzhi, who blames Qiao Feng for his plight. You Tanzhi is later captured by Liao soldiers at the border and sold into slavery. He meets Qiao Feng again after the latter has been renamed Xiao Feng and become a Liao prince, and attempts to kill him. Xiao Feng lets him go, but Azi captures him after he is released. While Azi tortures him for her sadistic amusement, he is so entranced by her beauty that he develops a crush on her and willingly succumbs to her and becomes her source of entertainment. Azi forces You Tanzhi to have an iron mask welded onto his head to conceal his identity, resulting in his face becoming disfigured, and she nicknames him "Iron Clown". Later, she forces him to let poisonous creatures bite him as part of her plan to learn the Xingxiu's School's "Energy Absorbing Skill". She leaves him to die after he is paralyzed by the bites but he finds the Yijin Jing by chance and uses the techniques in the manual to purge the poison from his body. He returns to Azi and repeats the bizarre ritual with her numerous times. He is eventually bitten by the Icy Worm, an extremely rare and poisonous insect, and ends up mastering a powerful skill that allows him to project streams of energy containing icy venom. After Azi is blinded by Ding Chunqiu, You Tanzhi saves her and promises her he will always take care of her. She does not recognise him, and he lies to her that his name is Zhuang Juxian, a new name he thought of by rearranging the three characters that make up the name of his old home. Later, he meets Quan Guanqing, who helps him remove the iron mask and manipulates him into becoming the puppet chief of the Beggars' Gang under his control. At Quan Guanqing's instigation, You Tanzhi challenges the Shaolin School for supremacy in a wulin gathering at Shaolin Monastery. At Shaolin, You Tanzhi sees Azi being held hostage by Ding Chunqiu, who threatens to kill her if he does not bow to him and call him "Master". You Tanzhi, ignoring the fact that he is the Beggars' Gang's chief, agrees to Ding Chunqiu's demands in front of the wulin. After Ding Chunqiu's defeat, You Tanzhi is denounced as a traitor of the Beggars' Gang and becomes an outcast of the wulin. In spite of these setbacks, he is unwilling to give up his crush on Azi and follows her everywhere. He even offers his eyes to her to help her regain her sense of sight after she is blinded by Ding Chunqiu, in the hope of winning some love and sympathy from her, but she despises him even more. He follows suit after Azi commits suicide to join Xiao Feng.
 You Ji and You Ju are the brothers who own the Heroes' Gathering Manor. You Ju is You Tanzhi's father while You Ji is You Tanzhi's uncle. Along with Xue Muhua, they host a wulin gathering for Han Chinese martial artists at their manor to discuss how to deal with Qiao Feng, who is seen as a threat to the wulin after he is wrongly accused of committing several murders. Qiao Feng shows up at the manor to find Xue Muhua to heal Azhu. The martial artists confront him and the situation escalates into a one-against-several battle after Qiao Feng toasts to sever ties with some of his old friends and acquaintances. The You brothers lose to Qiao Feng and commit suicide in shame after their weapons (which are also their family heirlooms) are shattered.
 Shan Zheng, nicknamed "Stern Faced Judge", is a reputable martial artist from Mount Tai. He appears at the Beggars' Gang meeting in Apricot Forest and is one of the few who know the "Leading Big Brother"'s true identity. He dies in a fire set by Xiao Yuanshan.
 Shan Boshan, Shan Zhongshan, Shan Shushan, Shan Jishan and Shan Xiaoshan are Shan Zheng's five sons. The first two are killed by Xiao Feng at Heroes' Gathering Manor while the rest die in the fire set by Xiao Yuanshan.
 Tan Gong and Tan Po are a reputable elderly couple from Chongxiao Cave in the Taihang Mountains known for their prowess in martial arts and medical skills. They are present at the Beggars' Gang meeting in Apricot Forest, and are among the few who know the "Leading Big Brother"'s true identity. Tan Po is killed by Xiao Yuanshan while Tan Gong commits suicide to join his wife.
 Zhao Qiansun is a cowardly martial artist who was involved in the attack on Xiao Yuanshan's family. He is Tan Po's senior and has always fancied her, so he often secretly meets her to chat and reminisce their good old days. The three Chinese characters that make up his name are incidentally the first three surnames in the Hundred Family Surnames. He is killed by Xiao Yuanshan.
 Qi Laoliu, nicknamed "Swift Saber Qi Liu", is a martial artist and former acquaintance of Qiao Feng. He is killed by Qiao Feng at Heroes' Gathering Manor after they toast to sever ties with each other.
 Xiang Wanghai is a martial artist from the east of the Xiang River. When Qiao Feng is toasting his old friends and acquaintances at Heroes' Gathering Manor to sever ties with them, he tries to have a drink with Qiao Feng too even though he has no past ties with him. Qiao Feng bluntly refuses, grabs him and knocks him out by tossing him aside.
 Bao Qianling, nicknamed "Penniless", is a martial artist known for stealing from the rich and helping the poor.

Wanjie Valley
 Zhong Wanchou, nicknamed "Horse Deity", is Gan Baobao's husband and the master of an estate in Wanjie Valley. He is extremely protective of his wife and he hates Duan Zhengchun because he thinks that the latter seduced his wife. However, he does not have the courage to confront Duan Zhengchun, so he places a sign at the valley's entrance which reads: "Any person with the family name Duan who enters this valley shall be killed without exception." At one point, he invites the "Four Evils" to help him kidnap Duan Yu and Mu Wanqing and make them to commit incest, with the intention of disgracing the Duan family. His plan backfires when Mu Wanqing is saved and replaced with Zhong Ling.
 Jinxi'er and Laifu'er are servants of the Zhong family. They are killed by Yue Laosan and Li Qingluo's servants respectively.

Limitless Sword School
The Limitless Sword School is based on Limitless Mountain. It is renamed "Limitless Cave" after it becomes a subject of Lingjiu Palace.

 Zuo Zimu is the leader of the eastern branch of the school.
 Xin Shuangqing is Zuo Zimu's junior and the leader of the western branch.
 Gong Guangjie dies after opening a letter smeared with poison from the Shennong Gang.
 Gan Guanghao and Ge Guangpei attempt to elope and they try to kill Duan Yu when he overhears their plan. Mu Wanqing shows up and kills them to save Duan Yu.
 Rong Ziju
 Yu Guangbiao
 Wu Guangsheng
 Tang Guangxiong

Heavenly Dragon Monastery
The Heavenly Dragon Monastery is a Buddhist monastery located in Dali. Some of the monks are former members of Dali's royal family. Like the royal family, they are trained in martial arts and their most powerful skill is the "Six Meridians Divine Sword", which allows the practitioner to project blade-like streams of energy from his fingers.

 Kurong is the most senior monk in the monastery. He lets Duan Yu read the "Six Meridians Divine Sword" manual and memorise it before destroying the manual to prevent Jiumozhi from obtaining it.
 Benyin is the abbot of the monastery.
 Benguan, Benxiang and Bencan combine forces with Benyin, Kurong and Benchen (Duan Zhengming) to counter Jiumozhi when he tries to seize the "Six Meridians Divine Sword" manual from the monastery.

Lords of the 36 Caves and 72 Islands
The Lords of the 36 Caves and 72 Islands are a loose assembly of martial artists who were implanted with the "Life and Death Talisman", a deadly poison, and forced into submission by Tianshan Tonglao. If they followed her orders, she would periodically give them an antidote to temporarily ease their suffering. They eventually decide to rebel against Lingjiu Palace when they could no longer stand Tianshan Tonglao's cruelty. Some of the lords are:

 Wu Laoda is the de facto leader of the lords. He chanced upon Tianshan Tonglao, who was in a temporary state of weakness, and mistook her for a servant girl and kidnapped her. Later, when he is meeting with the other lords to discuss their plan to rebel against Lingjiu Palace, he suggests that everyone kills the girl to pledge their loyalty to their cause. However, Xuzhu intervenes and saves Tianshan Tonglao before they could harm her.
 Sangtugong is the lord of Green Phosphorus Cave in Sichuan who is known for his ability to burrow underground to escape from enemies or launch surprise attacks. When Sangtugong tries to kill Xuzhu and Tianshan Tonglao, Xuzhu uses a technique (taught to him by Tianshan Tonglao) to flick conifer cones at Sangtugong, seemingly to disable him. However, Xuzhu does not realise that it is actually a lethal technique and unintentionally kills Sangtugong.
 Taoist Buping is nicknamed "Dragon King". He is unintentionally killed by Xuzhu along with Sangtugong.
 Sikong Xuan is the leader of the Shennong Gang. Early in the story, he holds Zhong Ling hostage after he is bitten by her pet, the Lightning Mink, whose bite is venomous because it hunts venomous snakes. He then forces Duan Yu to go to Zhong Ling's home to fetch him the antidote in exchange for her release. Later, he is fooled by Duan Yu and Mu Wanqing, who have disguised themselves as messengers from Lingjiu Palace, and releases Zhong Ling. He commits suicide eventually.
 Xuanhuangzi is the lord of Hornless Dragon Cave in Tibet.
 Zhang Dafu is the lord of Mysterious Island in the northern sea.
 Duanmu Yuan is the lord of Red Flame Cave on Wuzhi Mountain in Hainan.
 Madam Li is the lord of Palm Flower Island in the southern sea.
 Cui Lühua is nicknamed "Hibiscus Fairy".
 Zhuo Bufan, nicknamed "God of the Sword", is a formidable swordsman from the Yizihui Sword School.
 Island Lord Qin is the lord of Seahorse Island.
 Taoist Jiuyi is from the Thunder and Lightning School.
 Island Lord Ou is the lord of Swordfish Island. He is killed by Zhuo Bufan.
 Cave Lord Huo is the lord of Purple Rock Cave.
 Island Lord Yun
 Hadaba is the lord of Iron Turtle Island.
 Island Lord Sima
 Cave Lord Yu
 Cave Lord An

Funiu School
The Funiu School is based in the Funiu Mountains.

 Cui Baiquan, nicknamed "Golden Abacus", is Ke Baisui's junior. In the past, he offended the Murong family and was forced to take shelter in Dali, where he assumes a new identity as an accountant in Duan Zhengchun's residence. He spends most of his time drinking and gambling. Duan Yu befriends him through their common interest in weiqi.
 Guo Yanzhi, nicknamed "Soul Chasing Whip", is Ke Baisui's apprentice. He travels to Dali to seek Cui Baiquan's help in hunting down the person who murdered his master.
 Ke Baisui was the chief of the Funiu School who was murdered by Murong Bo, who had used his own signature move against him.

Nianhua Monastery
 Reverend Huangmei is the abbot of Nianhua Monastery who specialises in using the "Vajra Finger". He plays an important role in rescuing Duan Yu from Wanjie Valley by distracting Duan Yanqing in a game of weiqi while Duan Zhengchun's men dig a tunnel to the room where Duan Yu is held captive. He once met Murong Bo when the latter was still a boy, and had been nearly killed when the boy used the "Vajra Finger" to strike him in the chest, narrowly missing his heart.
 Pochen and Pochi are Reverend Huangmei's apprentices.

Penglai and Qingcheng Schools
The Penglai School is based in Penglai, Shandong while the Qingcheng School is based on Mount Qingcheng in Sichuan. The two schools have an ongoing rivalry.

 Dulingzi is the leader of the Penglai School.
 Sima Lin is the leader of the Qingcheng School. After his father, Sima Wei, was murdered by someone who used his own signature move against him, he thinks that Murong Fu is responsible so he goes to Gusu to confront Murong Fu.
 Zhu Baokun is a spy sent by the Penglai School to infiltrate the Qingcheng School.

Shenshan Shangren and associates
 Shenshan Shangren is the abbot of Qingliang Monastery on Mount Wutai. When he was younger, he wanted to join the Shaolin School, but was turned away because he was seen as too pretentious and arrogant. Although he subsequently joined Qingliang Monastery and eventually became the abbot, he still bore a grudge against the Shaolin School for rejecting him. Later, he finds an excuse to challenge Shaolin for the "ownership" of three of Shaolin's 72 most powerful skills, and brings along several reputable monks as witnesses to put pressure on Shaolin. He gives up and leaves after seeing how Jiumozhi apparently seems to have single-handedly mastered all the 72 skills.
 Boluoxing is a monk from India who was detained in Shaolin for years after he was caught stealing martial arts manuals.
 Zheluoxing is Boluoxing's senior. He accompanies Shenshan Shangren to Shaolin and demands the release of his junior.
 Reverend Guanxin is from Daxiangguo Monastery in Kaifeng.
 Reverend Daoqing is from Pudu Monastery in Jiangnan.
 Reverend Juexian is from Donglin Monastery in Jiujiang.
 Reverend Rongzhi is from Jingying Monastery in Chang'an.
 Reverend Shenyin is from Qingliang Monastery on Mount Wutai.

Others
 Xiao Yuanshan is Xiao Feng's father. 30 years ago, he and his family were attacked by a group of masked assailants at Yanmen Pass and his wife was killed. He attempted suicide by jumping off a cliff but survived and devoted himself to seeking vengeance on the attackers, whose leader he has identified to be Xuanci. Over the years, he has been hiding in Shaolin Monastery and secretly learning martial arts from the manuals in the library, while plotting to expose Xuanci's secret affair with Ye Erniang and publicly disgrace him one day. In the end, he realises how blinded he has been by his desire for revenge, and feels so grateful to the Sweeper Monk for saving him that he becomes a monk for the rest of his life.
 Reverend Zhiguang  is a reputable monk from Zhiguan Monastery on Mount Tiantai. Before he became a monk, he was involved in the attack on Xiao Yuanshan's family at Yanmen Pass 30 years ago. He regretted his actions and has since turned to Buddhism and done many good deeds to atone for his past sins. He appears at the Beggars' Gang meeting in Apricot Forest to narrate the events of the Yanmen Pass incident. Later, he commits suicide after declining to tell Xiao Feng the identity of the "Leading Big Brother".
 Qiao Sanhuai is Xiao Feng's adoptive father. He is killed along with his wife by Xiao Yuanshan for not telling their adoptive son about his true parentage.
 Yao Bodang is the master of the Qin Family Fort in Yunzhou. After his junior, Qin Boqi, was murdered by somebody who used his own signature move against him, he thinks that Murong Fu is responsible so he goes to Gusu to confront Murong Fu.
 Wang Tongzhi is a physician who fails to heal Azi of her internal injuries.

References
段正淳：分段忠实的爱情  - extract about Duan Zhengchun from Rankings of Characters in Jin Yong's Works (金庸人物排行榜) by Tan Xianmao (覃贤茂)

 
Lists of Jin Yong characters
Fictional Song dynasty people